Vladimir Lanyugin (born 21 December 1948) is a Russian equestrian. He competed in two events at the 1972 Summer Olympics.

References

External links
 

1948 births
Living people
Russian male equestrians
Soviet male equestrians
Olympic equestrians of the Soviet Union
Equestrians at the 1972 Summer Olympics
Sportspeople from Khabarovsk